WGLM (1380 AM) & WGLM-FM (106.3 FM) are radio stations owned by Packer Radio, owners of radio station WION in nearby Ionia. WGLM is licensed to Greenville and WGLM-FM to Lakeview and broadcasts a full-service mix of music, news and sports.
WGLM and WGLM-FM are airing a full-service mix of top-40 music from 1960-2006. The two stations are simulcast full-time.  Packer Radio bought the stations from Stafford Broadcasting in October 2008. Stafford owned both stations after acquiring them from Kortes Communications in 2000.

History
AM 1380 was originally WPLB, which featured a country format for many years.  In October 2000, the station became WSCG and moved to a satellite-fed adult standards format from Westwood One. WSCG switched to a simulcast of CNN Headline News in October 2002 and the following year added more talk programming, much of it from the Michigan Talk Radio Network.

WGLM-FM 106.3 was originally WRIZ and became WPLB-FM in 1993. The station became WSCG-FM in October 2000 following its sale to Stafford Broadcasting, and in January 2001 switched from country music to a talk format as "106 The Source," the flagship station for the then-new Michigan Talk Radio Network.  After a little more than six months, "106 The Source" was replaced by Jones Radio's "Classic Hit Country" format. WSCG-FM switched from "Classic Hit Country" to Jones' "True Country" in February 2006.

The original WPLB-FM, 107.3, became WODJ with an oldies format in 1989 and later became WBBL-FM. 107.3 FM has since moved its studios to Grand Rapids, and it and 1380 AM are no longer co-owned. On December 19, 2008, the WSCG and WSCG-FM call signs were changed to WGLM and WGLM-FM. After Christmas of 2008, the stations adopted a full-service mix of music, news and sports. In August 2010, WGLM switched from a simulcast of WGLM-FM to the "Classic Country" format. The stations are now known as "M106-3" and "M-1380".

The WGLM calls, which stand for "Greenville, Lakeview and Montcalm/Mecosta counties," were most recently used at a former adult contemporary FM station in West Lafayette, Indiana, which now airs adult contemporary programming as WLQQ.

Sources
Michiguide.com - WGLM History
Michiguide.com - WGLM-FM History
Michiguide is no longer available.

External links

GLM
Adult hits radio stations in the United States
Radio stations established in 2002
2002 establishments in Michigan
Full service radio stations in the United States